Iris Kremer-Roseneck (born 25 July 1967) is a Luxembourgian sports shooter. She competed in the women's 10 metre air rifle event at the 1996 Summer Olympics.

References

External links
 

1967 births
Living people
Luxembourgian female sport shooters
Olympic shooters of Luxembourg
Shooters at the 1996 Summer Olympics
Place of birth missing (living people)